François Duprat (26 October 1940 – 18 March 1978) was an essayist and politician, a founding member of the Front National party and part of the leadership until his assassination in 1978. Duprat was one of the main architects in the introduction of Holocaust denial in France.

Life and career
François Duprat was born on 26 October 1940, in Ajaccio, Corsica, and was educated in Bayonne, Toulouse, at the prestigious Lycée Louis-le-Grand in Paris. He graduated in history at the Sorbonne, earning a diploma of higher studies in history in 1963.

A communist in his teenage years, François Duprat moved to the far right and became a member of the Jeune Nation and the Federation of Nationalist Students (FEN). Strongly opposed to Algerian independence during the Algerian War (1954–62), Duprat later supported Arab states as an anti-Zionist. After the March 1962 Evian agreements granting independence to Algeria, he traveled to Katanga, supporting the secession led by Moise Tshombe. He became Tshome's Director of Propaganda on Radio-Katanga.

Thereafter, he returned to France, where he became a member of Occident, which carried out street brawls against the Maoists and other left-wing students. However, he was excluded in 1967, accused of being a police informant. Duprat then took part in the Ordre Nouveau movement (New Order), and became the editor of L'Action européenne (European Action) and of the Revue d’histoire du fascisme (History Review of Fascism), which introduced in France Holocaust denial thesis supported by far right circles in the English-world.

In 1972, François Duprat co-founded the National Front (FN) headed by Jean-Marie Le Pen, and was part of its political bureau until his death in 1978. He represented the hard-liners of the party, and directed the Groupes nationalistes révolutionnaires (National Revolutionary Groups), alongside Alain Renault.

Revisionist writings
François Duprat saw history as a political weapon, stating in May 1976:

<blockquote>We must not let to our opponents, Marxists and régimistes, the monopoly of the historical representation of men, facts and ideas. Because History is a wonderful war instrument, and it would be useless to deny that one of the important reasons of our political hardships resides in the historical exploitation and the systematic deformation of the nationalist experiences of the past... It is in order to answer these needs... that a team of intellectuals, professors and nationalists have created the Revue d'histoire du fascisme."<ref>« Front historique », Année Zéro, May 1976. French: « Nous ne devons pas laisser à nos adversaires, marxistes et régimistes, le monopole de la présentation historique des hommes, des faits et des idées. Car l'Histoire est un merveilleux instrument de combat et il serait vain de nier qu'une des raisons importantes de nos difficultés politiques réside dans l'exploitation historique et la déformation systématique des expériences nationalistes du passé. (...) C'est pour répondre à ce besoin (...) qu'une équipe d'intellectuels, de professeurs, de nationalistes a créé la Revue d'Histoire du fascisme.</ref></blockquote>

Duprat wrote a book on far right movements in France from 1940 to 1944, during the Collaborationist regime of Vichy. He also created a number of magazines and political reviews, including the Cahiers d'histoire du fascisme (History Notebooks on Fascism) and the Cahiers Européens-Notre Europe (European Notebooks - Our Europe), which also circulated denialist books or far right literature exalting the Third Reich.

Death
Duprat was killed on 18 March 1978, in a car-bomb explosion. His wife Jeanine was also injured in the attack, losing the use of her legs. He was finishing a book titled Argent et politique (Money and Politics) concerning the funding of right-wing and far-right political parties. There are many theories about the assassination, but historian Michel Winock notes that perpetrators and their motives have never been established; the police investigation into his assassination was inconclusive.

A Jewish "Remembrance Commando" and a "Jewish Revolutionary Group" immediately claimed responsibility for the murder. The perpetrators of the bombing were never found, while Jean-Pierre Bloch, director of the LICRA anti-racist NGO, condemned the killing.

In Génération Occident: de l'extrême droite à la droite, Frédéric Charpier alleged that the assassination could have been commissioned by a rival far right organisation. He recalled that Duprat had been excluded in 1967 from Occident after allegations that he was a police informant. According to Roger Faligot and Pascal Krop, Duprat was killed for his links with the Syrian government.

Shortly before the assassination, Patrice Chairoff had published names and addresses of publishers which were tied to Duprat; one of the addresses happened to be his private residence.
His funeral at the church of Saint-Nicolas-du-Chardonnet was attended by the leading lights of the nationalist right, which included the National Front, the  PFN, monarchists and right-wing solidarists.Joseph Algazy, op. cit., p. 170.

LegacyLe National, a far right political review, honoured him in April 1978 as one of the French leaders of "the 'revisionist' historical school" who had introduced in France "one of the most explosive booklets" of Richard Harwood, member of the British National Front and author of the negationist pamphlet "Did Six Million Really Die?" The Cahiers européens – Notre Europe diffused this pamphlet starting in February 1976. The anonymous author of this text had been identified by Pierre-André Taguieff as likely being André Delaporte.

Each year Jean-Marie Le Pen pays his respects at Duprat's gravesite at the cimetière de Montmartre. At the 30th anniversary of his death, LePen paid tribute to his being a "martyr to the cause of freedom of thought", "a fighter", and "politician right to the tips of his fingers".

Notes

References

Further reading
 Chebel d'Appollonia, A., L'Extrême Droite en France: De Maurras à Le Pen. Éditions Complexe, Brussels, 2nd edition, 1996. 
 Duprat, François. L'Internationale étudiante révolutionnaire (Revolutionary Student International), N.E.L., 1968.
 Igounet, Valérie, Histoire du négationnisme en France. Éditions du Seuil, Paris, 2000.  (in particular the chapter L'extrême droite diffuse les thèses négationnistes / François Duprat, un passeur idéologique, p. 161 to 180).
Lebourg, Nicolas. François Duprat: Idéologies, Combats, Souvenirs'', Perpignan 2000.

1940 births
1978 deaths
Politicians from Ajaccio
Neo-fascists
University of Paris alumni
Historians of fascism
Historians of Nazism
French Holocaust deniers
French fascists
French nationalists
National Rally (France) politicians
Assassinated French politicians
Lycée Louis-le-Grand alumni
20th-century French historians
French magazine founders
Writers from Ajaccio
Former Marxists